Hearts of Humanity is a 1936 British drama film directed by John Baxter and starring Bransby Williams, Wilfred Walter and Cathleen Nesbitt. The film was made at Shepperton Studios. The film's art direction was by John Bryan. Like many of Baxter's films of the era, it is set amongst the underprivileged.

Plot
Following a whispering campaign against him, a Church of England vicar leaves his parish and goes to London. Struck by remorse, one of his accusers gets his son to try to find him and make amends. Although from a wealthy background, the young man spends time amongst the down-and-outs of the city, until he finds the heavily-disguised priest leading the poor in resistance against exploitation by a socially well-connected criminal gang.

Partial cast
 Bransby Williams as Mike Timmins 
 Wilfred Walter as Reverend John Maitland  
 Cathleen Nesbitt as Mrs. Bamford  
 Pamela Randall as Ann Bamford  
 Eric Portman as Jack Clinton  
 Hay Petrie as Alf Hooper 
 J. Fisher White as Dad  
 Fred Duprez as Manager

References

Bibliography
 Low, Rachael. Filmmaking in 1930s Britain. George Allen & Unwin, 1985.
 Wood, Linda. British Films, 1927-1939. British Film Institute, 1986.

External links

1936 films
British drama films
British black-and-white films
1936 drama films
1930s English-language films
Films directed by John Baxter
Films shot at Shepperton Studios
Films set in England
Films set in London
1930s British films